The 2000 Supercheap Auto GT Production Car 3 Hour Showroom Showdown was an endurance race for GT Production Cars
The event was staged at the Mount Panorama Circuit, Bathurst, New South Wales, Australia on Saturday 19 November 2000 as a support event on program for the 2000 FAI 1000.

Some V8 Supercar drivers took part in the race such as John Faulkner, Greg Murphy, Steven Richards and Rick Kelly, despite their V8 Supercar commitments in the Bathurst 1000 race. After finishing third in 1998 and second in 1999, the driver pairing of Ed Aitken and John Faulkner won the race, driving a HSV GTS instead of the Porsche 911 RS Clubsport of the previous two races.

Class structure
Class structure was substantially different than for the 1999 race. The previous Class A for Supercars of up to $300,000 purchase price were no longer eligible. These cars had moved from the Showroom Showdown's parent category; the Australian GT Production Car Championship to the Australian Nations Cup Championship. The former Class B was the new Class A. The former Class S was the new Class B. Class C, D and E were changed from being split into three classes via engine capacity to engine configuration. Class D was most affected. The Class D Holdens and Hondas were moved to Class E while the Class D Mazdas now had to race against to bulk of the former Class C Fords, Holdens, Mitsubishis and Toyotas who were all more powerful and faster. Class C was now a battle for SS Commodores and XR8 Falcons.
Cars competed in the following five classes:
Class A : High Performance Cars
Class B : Sports Touring Cars
Class C : V8 Touring Cars
Class D : Six Cylinder Touring Cars
Class E : Four Cylinder Touring Cars

Results

References

Auto Action, 24–30 November 2000
 Natsoft Race Result
Natsoft practice and qualifying results

Motorsport in Bathurst, New South Wales
Supercheap